The Lemovīcēs (Gaulish: *Lēmouīcēs, 'those who vanquish by the elm') were a Gallic tribe dwelling in the modern Limousin region during the Iron Age and the Roman period.

Name 
They are mentioned as Lemovices by Caesar (mid-1st c. BC) and Pliny (1st c. AD), Lemoouíkes (Λεμοουίκες) by Strabo (early 1st c. AD), and as Limouikoí (Λιμουικοί) by Ptolemy (2nd c. AD).

The Gaulish ethnonym *Lemouīcēs literally means 'those who vanquish by the elm', probably in reference to the wood from which were made their spears or bows. It derives from the stem lēmo- ('elm'; cf. OIr. lem, Middle Welsh liwyfen) attached to the suffix -uices ('victors'). The Proto-Celtic stem *lēmo- or *limo- ultimately derives from Proto-Indo-European *h₁élem or *h₁leym- ('elm'; cf. Latin ulmus 'elm', Old Norse almr 'elm, bow', Russian il'm 'mountain elm').

The city of Limoges, attested ca. 400 AD as civitas Lemovicum ('civitas of the Lemovices', Lemovicas in 844, Lemotges in 1208), and the Limousin region, attested in the 6th c. AD as Lemovicinum (pago Lemovicino in 860, Lemozi in 1071–1127), are named after the Gallic tribe.

History 
They established themselves in Limousin and Poitou between 700 and 400 BC.

In 52 BC, some 10,000 Lemovician combatants fought against Julius Caesar at the Battle of Alesia as allies to the Arverni under Vercingetorix. Their chief, Sedullos, was killed during the battle.

Geography

Settlements 
Their pre-Roman chief town was Durotincum, probably corresponding to the oppidum of Villejoubert. After their incorporation into the Roman province of Aquitania, Augustoritum (Limoges) was the capital of the civitas Lemovicum. In the 1st c. AD, it was administered by the vergobretus, and later by a duumviri.

Briva Curretia (Brive; from Gaulish briua 'bridge'), Blatomago (Blond) and Carovicus (Château-Chervix) are known vici ('villages') of the Lemovician territory.

Other locations associated with them were Acitodunum (Ahun), Argentate (Argentat), Cassinomagus (Chassenon), Roncomagus (Rancon), Excingidiacum (Yssandon) et Uxellum (Ussel). One of their main sanctuaries was recently found in Tintignac including several unique objects in the world such as "carnyx".

Economy 
Their territory was a region rich in gold, tin and iron.

Archaeologists during the latter part of the 19th century found gold mines in the Lemovician settlement in Limousin, particularly in the south-western region of the Massif Central in west-central France. This discovery allowed the identification of techniques and the chronology of the mining activity because the Lemovices did not mention their mining heritage and their gold.

References

Bibliography

External links
Who Was Who in Roman Times
Lemovices at the Galician Wikipedia

 
Gauls
Tribes of pre-Roman Gaul
Historical Celtic peoples